Edison Fonseca (born February 25, 1984) is a Colombian footballer who currently  plays for Ayeyawady United. He has played in 14 matches for the Colombian U-20 national team, scoring six goals.

Career
Fonseca has played for Deportivo Pereira, Envigado, Atlético Nacional, Deportes Tolima, Cobresal, Cúcuta Deportivo, and Pelita Jaya in the  Indonesia Super League.

Fonseca signed to play for Iranian club Mes Rafsanjan F.C. in September 2010 but barely six months later returned to Colombia, negating his contract with Mes Rafsanjan on January 28, 2011. His contract with Mes Rafsanjan was terminated due to just cause. The case has been reviewed and approved by FIFA.

In December 2011,  he moved to Vietnam and signed a contract with Navibank Saigon F.C. He also included in Navibank Saigon F.C.  squads for 2011-2012 Vietnamese Super Cup on December 17, 2011. He was the joint second top scorer for Navibank in the 2012 AFC Cup with 8 goals.

References

External links
Goal.com: Edison Fonseca profile
Profile at GolGolGol.net

1984 births
Living people
Colombian footballers
Colombia under-20 international footballers
Colombian expatriate footballers
Deportivo Pereira footballers
Envigado F.C. players
Atlético Nacional footballers
Deportes Tolima footballers
Alianza F.C. footballers
Cobresal footballers
Cúcuta Deportivo footballers
Pelita Jaya FC players
Mes Rafsanjan players
Navibank Sài Gòn FC players
Yadanarbon F.C. players
Ayeyawady United F.C. players
Categoría Primera A players
Chilean Primera División players
Liga 1 (Indonesia) players
Expatriate footballers in Chile
Expatriate footballers in El Salvador
Expatriate footballers in Indonesia
Expatriate footballers in Iran
Expatriate footballers in Vietnam
Expatriate footballers in Myanmar
Colombian expatriate sportspeople in Chile
Colombian expatriate sportspeople in El Salvador
Colombian expatriate sportspeople in Indonesia
Colombian expatriate sportspeople in Iran
Colombian expatriate sportspeople in Vietnam
Colombian expatriate sportspeople in Myanmar
Association football forwards
Sportspeople from Valle del Cauca Department